Mohammad Hussain (8 October 1976 – 11 April 2022) was a Pakistani cricketer who played in 2 Tests and 14 ODIs between 1996 and 1998. A left-handed batsman and slow left-arm orthodox spin bowler, he played first-class cricket for a number of teams in Pakistan between 1994 and 2009.

He was involved in the "Toronto incident" with Inzamam-ul-Haq in September 1997, as the 12th man who provided a cricket bat to Inzamam before he attacked a member of the crowd.

At the time of his death, he had been suffering with a kidney-related illness and was on dialysis.

References

1976 births
2022 deaths
Pakistan Test cricketers
Pakistan One Day International cricketers
Pakistani cricketers
Cricketers at the 1998 Commonwealth Games
Lahore City cricketers
United Bank Limited cricketers
National Bank of Pakistan cricketers
Sui Northern Gas Pipelines Limited cricketers
Lahore Blues cricketers
Lahore Whites cricketers
Pakistan Customs cricketers
Lahore Eagles cricketers
Pakistan Telecommunication Company Limited cricketers
Cricketers from Lahore
Commonwealth Games competitors for Pakistan
People from Lahore